The red wall is a term used in British politics to describe constituencies in the Midlands and Northern England which historically supported the Labour Party.

At the 2019 general election, many of these constituencies supported the Conservative Party, with the media describing the red wall as having "turned blue".

At the 2021 Hartlepool by-election, the Conservatives won for the first time in decades in another red wall seat. The 2021 Batley and Spen by-election was also for a red wall seat; Labour held the seat, albeit with a reduced majority.

In the 2022 Wakefield by-election, Labour regained their first red wall seat; this was also their first gain in any by-election since 2012.

Background 
Historically, the working class-dominated constituencies in the North Midlands and Northern England tended to favour the Labour Party. As early as the 1906 general election, two-thirds of Labour candidates elected came from Northern English constituencies. In 2014, political scientists Robert Ford and Matthew Goodwin documented the erosion by the UK Independence Party (UKIP) of the Labour-supporting working-class vote in their book, Revolt on the Right.

At the 2017 general election, the Conservatives lost seats overall, but did gain six Labour-held seats in the Midlands and North, which Labour had held for at least three decades: North East Derbyshire, Walsall North, Mansfield, Stoke-on-Trent South, Middlesbrough South and East Cleveland and Copeland (held from the 2017 Copeland by-election). In 2019, the Conservatives increased their majority in the seats previously gained.

Former Brexit Party leader Nigel Farage has suggested prior support of many northern Labour voters for UKIP (which he had also led) and the Brexit Party made it easier for them to vote Conservative.

2019 general election results 

At the 2019 general election, the Conservative Party had a net gain of 48 seats in England. The Labour Party, however, had a net loss of 47 seats in England, losing approximately 20% of its 2017 general election support in "red wall" seats. All of these seats voted to leave the EU by substantial margins, and Brexit appears to have played a role in these seats changing hands.

Voters in seats such as Bolsover, and swing voters of the type thought to be typified by 'Workington man', cited Brexit and the leadership of Jeremy Corbyn as reasons why they chose not to vote Labour. The party lost so much support in the "red wall" in some seats, such as Sedgefield, Ashfield and Workington, that even without the Tory vote share increase, the Conservatives would still have gained those seats. Notable examples of "red wall" constituencies taken by the Conservatives include:

Criticism of the term

Generalisation
The "red wall" metaphor has been criticised as a generalisation. Author and Newcastle University lecturer Alex Niven said it was "a convenient term of journalese that seemed to arise in the last days of the 2019 campaign to describe a large, disparate part of the country north of Oxford." Lewis Baston called it "a mythical wall" and "a way of making a patronising generalisation about a huge swathe of England (and a corner of Wales)". He argued that the "red wall" is politically diverse, and includes bellwether seats which swung with the national trend, as well as former mining and industrial seats which show a more unusual shift.

Meanwhile, Rosie Lockwood from the Institute for Public Policy Research, said: "For years the Westminster establishment has sought to define the north through soundbites. The most recent is 'the red wall'." In an article for The Daily Telegraph, Royston Smith, MP for Southampton Itchen, made the case that his seat in post-industrial Southampton was one of the first red wall seats gained from the Labour Party when he became its Conservative MP at the 2015 general election.

In July 2021, following Labour's narrow victory in the Batley and Spen by-election, David Edgerton, professor of Modern British History at King's College London, denounced the concept of the red wall, pointing out that "the belief that working-class people traditionally voted Labour has only been true (and barely so) for a mere 25 years of British history, and a long time ago." He went on to say:

"The phenomenon of a working-class red wall is an ideological concoction that benefits Labour's enemies. It makes little sociological or psephological sense today, and the fragment of the past it reflects is one of Tory working classes. Yet this group has come to define how Labour thinks of the working class. That the party views this Tory analysis as a bellwether of its fortunes speaks to its collapse as an independent, transformative political force. If it is ever to win significant support today among real English people, Labour needs to understand its own history, celebrate its successes and love itself, its members and its voters.

Labour undoubtedly still needs the working-class vote. Winning this means creating a Labour party for workers and trade unionists in the present day, not those of a mythologised past. Doing better among those workers than Labour did in its heyday would also be necessary for electoral success. The party needs to relearn not only how to get votes, but how to keep them too, which it has failed to do for decades. To make all this possible it needs to present a real alternative with vigour and confidence, and to stop acting as if it believed that this uniquely dangerous Conservative government had the British past, present and future in its bones."

Demographics
In January 2022, Anthony Wells, Director of Political Research at YouGov UK, wrote an article on his Substack titled "Stop obsessing about the Red Wall". In it, he criticised political commentators and politicians who use the term "based upon a perception of what the author's idea of a stereotypical working class Conservative voter would think, rather missing the point of James [Kanagasooriam]'s original hypothesis that voters in those areas were actually demographically similar to more Tory areas ... [T]hese were seats that for cultural reasons were less Conservative than you would have expected given their demographics. To some degree that has unwound in some areas. There is probably not an easy way for Labour to rebuild that reluctance to consider voting Tory in places where it has collapsed. It is also worth considering whether it has even fully played out... it may be there is further realignment to go."

Class and social issues
Newcastle University geography professor Danny MacKinnon said that the weakening relationship between Labour and "red wall" voters can be traced back to the late 1990s, when New Labour aimed for middle-class support. He said that "Labour became more of a middle-class party. [Red wall areas] have older voters who have had lower living standards since 2010. There's the phrase 'left behind'. And there's a sense of cultural alienation from Labour and metropolitan cities."

David Jeffery, a lecturer in British Politics at the University of Liverpool, claimed that "the Conservative party's new supporters aren't really that different from their old ones". Using data from the British Election Study, he analysed the attitudes between voters within and without the "red wall" and found that "[t]he differences between Red Wall and non-Red Wall voters (and switchers) is marginal across all three topics, suggesting [that] 'going woke' isn't a unique threat to the party's new electoral coalition any more than it is to their voter base in general."

In May 2021, YouGov released the results of a large survey which "somewhat contradicts 'evidence' from vox-pops and commentary on the underlying reasons for voters moving away from Labour in these constituencies." According to Patrick English:

"Our survey shows that rather than being a bastion of social conservativism within Britain, these constituencies up and down the North and Midlands contain a great diversity of opinions, and indeed widespread support for a range of what we might consider progressive policies and views.

Furthermore, where Red Wall voters do exhibit socially conservative attitudes, they are not significant stronger (or no more common) than the level of social conservativism which we see among the British public in general.

In other words, the Red Wall is no more socially conservative than Britain as a whole, and characterisation of voters in these areas as predominantly "small c" conservatives concerned about social liberalisation or culture wars is not supported by polling evidence."

Responding to this survey, Jeremy Corbyn's former senior policy adviser, Andrew Fisher, insisted that the concept of the "mythologised" red wall was "part of a decades-long agenda aimed at undermining progressive causes."

Ethnic minority voters
In Tribune magazine, Jason Okundaye warned Labour not to forget about its "other heartlands", i.e. black and South Asian voters in urban areas. He said that during the New Labour years, "Labour felt it could ignore the concerns of working-class voters because they were assumed to be pious followers of the Labour religion. Peter Mandelson's belief that they had 'nowhere else to go' became a creedal statement. What it failed to see was a class of increasing political atheists. It is not hard to imagine the same thing happening in future to ethnic minority communities."

Other similar terms

Tartan wall
The use of the term "tartan wall" has been used to refer to the formerly Labour-voting areas in the formerly industrial Central Belt in Scotland, which slowly progressed towards voting for the Scottish National Party (SNP) in the 2015 general election. This resulted in the borderline extinction of Scottish Labour MPs, as only Ian Murray (Edinburgh South) retained his seat whilst 40 other constituencies were won by the SNP.

Though these seats did not fall to the Scottish Conservatives in the 2019 election and thus are not commonly included in the category of the "red wall", it has been argued that much of the same disillusionment felt in the parts of England and Wales that resulted in the loss of those seats in 2019 was also present in 2015 in Scotland. Perhaps a predictor for the now red wall seats in England, Labour's decline in Scotland has largely been seen as ongoing, as though they saw a small revival in the 2017 election, winning seven seats, this was seen as part the national trend towards Labour as well as lower turnout among SNP voters; in the 2019 election, the party lost six of its seats, again reducing it to one MP.

Red belt

Journalist Nicholas Burgess Farrell has used the term "red wall" to describe the Red belt, historically left-supporting regions of Italy, such as Emilia-Romagna which are under comparable pressure by Matteo Salvini and his right-wing populist Lega Nord party.

See also 
 Blue wall (British politics)
 Blue wall (U.S. politics)
 2015 United Kingdom general election in Scotland, when Labour support, particularly in the Central Belt, was lost to the SNP, in what has been termed the "tartan wall"
 2021 Hartlepool by-election
 2021 Batley and Spen by-election
 2022 Wakefield by-election

References

External links 
 Kanagasooriam, James & Simon, Elizabeth. "Red Wall: The Definitive Description". Political Insight. 12 (3): 8–11. doi:10.1177/20419058211045127. ISSN 2041-9058.

Political terms in the United Kingdom
2019 United Kingdom general election
Electoral geography